The Indian diaspora in Southeast Africa consists of approximately 3 million people of Indian origin. Some of this diaspora in Southeast Africa arrived in the 19th century from British India as indentured labourers, many of them to work on the Kenya–Uganda railway. Others had arrived earlier by sea as traders.

Today, the Indian community in Southeast Africa is largely affluent and play leading roles in the region's business sector and dominate the economies of many countries in the region.

Sub-groups

Indian Ocean islands
 Indians in Madagascar
 Indo-Mauritian (Bihari)
 Réunionnais of Indian origin (Malbars)
 Indo-Seychellois

Mainland Southeast Africa
 Indians in Kenya
 Indians in Mozambique
 Indians in Tanzania
 Indians in Uganda
 Indians in Zambia
 Indians in Botswana
 Indians in South Africa
 Indians in Zimbabwe

History

Indian trade activities and settlements in Southeast Africa may date back to the late 1st millennium CE. Muhammad al-Idrisi, an Arab geographer, records Indian settlements at Sofala (now present-day Mozambique) in the 12th century.

Following the passage of the 1833 Slavery Abolition Act, the Indian indenture system developed to replace slave labour in British and other European colonies. The system, inaugurated in 1834 in Mauritius, involved the use of licensed agents after the abolition of slavery. These agents imported indentured Indian labour to replace the freed slaves. The indentured were legally supposed to receive either minimal wages or some small form of payout (such as a small parcel of land, or the money for their return passage) upon completion of their indentures. Employers did not have the right to buy or sell indentured labourers as they did slaves. However, the conditions faced by the indentured labourers were frequently abysmal.

Of the original 32,000 contracted labourers, after the end of indentured service about 6,700 stayed on to work as dukawallas, artisans, traders, clerks, and, finally, lower-level administrators. Colonial personnel practices excluded them from the middle and senior ranks of the colonial government and from farming; instead they became commercial middlemen and professionals, including doctors and lawyers.

It was the dukawalla, not European settlers, who first moved into new colonial areas. Even before the dukawallas, Indian traders had followed the Arab trading routes inland on the coast of modern-day Kenya and Tanzania. Indians had a virtual lock on Zanzibar's lucrative trade in the 19th century, working as the Sultan's exclusive agents.

Between the building of the railways and the end of World War II, the number of Indians in Southeast Africa swelled to 320,000. By the 1940s, some colonial areas had already passed laws restricting the flow of immigrants, as did white-ruled Rhodesia in 1924. But by then, the Indians had firmly established control of commercial trade — some 80 to 90 percent in Kenya and Uganda was in the hands of Indians — plus some industrial activities. In 1948, all but 12 of Uganda's 195 cotton ginneries were Indian run.  Banknotes of the East African shilling had values written in Gujarati as well as English and Arabic.

Many Parsis settled in Zanzibar to work as merchants and civil servants for the colonial government. They formed one of the largest Parsi communities outside of India, a community that survived until the Zanzibar Revolution of 1964. Indians in Zanzibar founded the one locally owned bank in all of the African Great Lakes, Jetha Lila, which closed after the Revolution when its customer base left.

Expulsion and repatriation to Uganda

In 1972, Idi Amin gave the nearly 80,000 Ugandans of Asian (mainly Indians) descent 90 days to leave the country, so an expulsion was set in effect. Many of them were holding citizenship and passports of the UK and colonies rather than of Uganda. 23,000 had successfully gained citizenship and several thousand more had pending applications but these were all cancelled by Amin immediately prior to the expulsion. These descendants of the Dukawallas and Indian coolies then comprised about 2 percent of the population. Their businesses and property were "Africanized" and given to native Ugandans.

Some 27,000 Ugandan Indians moved to Britain, another 6,100 to Canada, 1,100 to the United States, while the rest scattered to other Asian and European countries.

Today, however, many of these same ethnic Indians have returned. In 1992, under pressure from aid donors and Western governments, Ugandan President Yoweri Museveni simplified a then 10-year-old law letting Asians reacquire lost property.

 Sikh and Hindu temples are found in the urban Southeast African urban landscape, as do mosques, particularly those built by the large Ismaili Muslim community, which immigrated from Gujarat. Some extended families — the backbone of the Indian ethnic group — are prospering under Uganda's new openness. Two families, the Mehtas and Madhvanis, have built multimillion-dollar empires in Uganda since the 1980s.

Still, the Indian communities remain concerned about their position in Southeast Africa. Continued fighting in western Uganda between hundreds of rebels and troops in June 2000, and politically motivated ethnic violence in Mombasa that claimed more than 40 lives in August 2000, gave credence to these concerns. Around 15-25,000 Indians currently live in Uganda.

Cultural depictions

The lives of the Wahindi (Swahili for "Indians") were first fictionalized for a Western mass audience in V. S. Naipaul's A Bend in the River. The Trinidadian West Indies author's 1979 book remains the best-known literary work in English addressing the Indian experience in East and Central Africa. Though recently A Bend in the River enjoyed a resurgence of critical acclaim for its dead-on portrayal of post-colonial African life in the former Zaire (renamed the Democratic Republic of Congo), the novel also lifted the curtain on an ethnic group who had become central to Southeast Africa's life in the later half of the 20th century.

The experience is touched upon in the films Mississippi Masala, Touch of Pink, The Last King of Scotland and Bohemian Rhapsody.

Books written on the socio-cultural and economic climate and realities experienced by the Indian diaspora, particularly the Nizari Ismailis include The Book of Secrets and The Gunny Sack, by M. G. Vassanji, himself a Nizari Ismaili.

See also 

 Asian Africans
 Coolie
 Non-resident Indian and Overseas Citizen of India

Notes

References

Further reading 
 Dharam P. Ghai and Yash P. Ghai, "Asians in East Africa: Problems and Prospects", Journal of Modern African Studies, 3 (1965), pp. 35–51.
 Gijsbert Oonk, Settled Strangers: Asian Business Elites in East Africa (1800-1900), London, Delhi, Los Angeles, Sage 2013, 284 pages.
 Gijsbert Oonk, Global Indian Diasporas: Exploring Trajectories of Migration and Theory, Amsterdam University Press, Amsterdam 2007.

External links 
 Asians in Africa

Southeast Africa
Indian diaspora in Africa
Diaspora